Harold Frederick Pitts (29 April 1915 — 1998) was an English footballer who played as a full-back.

Career
In 1931, Pitts joined Fulham. After failing to establish himself in the first team, Pitts joined Working. In 1935, following a spell at Islington Corinthians, Pitts re-signed for Fulham, making 10 Football League appearances for the club over the course of four years. In 1939, Pitts signed for Chelmsford City, remaining with the club until the 1945–46 season.

References

1915 births
1998 deaths
Association football defenders
English footballers
Footballers from Leyton
Fulham F.C. players
Woking F.C. players
Chelmsford City F.C. players
English Football League players
Southern Football League players
Date of death missing